Banasa lenticularis is a species of stink bug in the family Pentatomidae. It is found in the Caribbean, Central America, North America, and South America.

References

Further reading

 
 
 
 
 
 
 
 

Articles created by Qbugbot
Insects described in 1894
Pentatomini